Acinetobacter lanii is a Gram-negative, non-haemolytic and non-motile bacterium from the genus of Acinetobacter which has been isolated from the faeces of a Kiang from the Tibetan Plateau.

References

Moraxellaceae
Bacteria described in 2021